Metton is a runny French cheese made in Franche-Comté, mostly used as an ingredient for making Cancoillotte. The traditional process to produce Cancoillotte with metton is to cook it in an earthenware pot with some water or milk, then to add salt and butter (garlic is an option).

References

External links 
 text for the "La cancoillotte" song by Hubert-Félix Thiéfaine

French cheeses
Cow's-milk cheeses
Culture of Franche-Comté